Héctor Altamirano Escudero (born 17 March 1977) is a Mexican former professional footballer and manager. Nicknamed "El Pity", he usually played the position of right-back.

Club career
Altamirano made his debut in the Primera División in the 1997 Winter season with Cruz Azul after coming up through their youth ranks.  However, after a less than satisfactory year with only six appearances, he transferred to Santos Laguna. Since joining Santos, Altamirano has become a constant danger on the team's right flank, and in his six years with the club, he has started 212 games and scored 36 goals. After his successful spell with Santos Laguna, the Mexican footballer was sold to newly ascended San Luis during the summer 2005 transfer window, or the "Draft", as it is commonly known in Mexico. After a successful year at San Luis in which Altamirano helped the club reach a league final, Altamirano joined CA Monarcas Morelia during the summer of 2006.  With no big success he was then transferred to Tecos.

Altamirano joined Correcaminos for the Apertura 2008–09 season.

More recently, he is venturing into new business enterprises outside of professional football. He announced on April 6, 2016, in an interview with Reforma that he is opening a mid-size fish aquarium in San Luis, a city he represented as a player. His aquarium hosts mostly sea fish and mammals, including white sharks and orcas.

International career

International goals

Scores and results list Mexico's goal tally first.

References

External links
 
 

1977 births
Living people
Mexico international footballers
Cruz Azul footballers
Atlético Morelia players
Santos Laguna footballers
Footballers from Oaxaca
San Luis F.C. players
Tecos F.C. footballers
C.D. Veracruz footballers
Querétaro F.C. footballers
Correcaminos UAT footballers
2004 Copa América players
2005 CONCACAF Gold Cup players
Liga MX players
Pan American Games gold medalists for Mexico
Association football fullbacks
Pan American Games medalists in football
Footballers at the 1999 Pan American Games
Medalists at the 1999 Pan American Games
Mexican footballers